Gauromydas is a genus of giant flies belonging to the family Mydidae that are found in the Neotropics.

Species
Species within this genus include:
Gauromydas apicalis  (Wiedemann, 1830) 
Gauromydas autuorii  (Andretta, 1951) 
Gauromydas heros  (Perty, 1833) 
Gauromydas mateus  Calhau, Lamas and Nihei, 2015
Gauromydas mystaceus  (Wiedemann, 1830) 
Gauromydas papaveroi  Calhau, Lamas and Nihei, 2015

References